Punjab Spectrum is Punjabi News paper published at Amritsar.

References

Punjabi-language newspapers